Eximious is an album by jazz guitarist Joe Pass and double bassist Niels-Henning Ørsted Pedersen that was released in 1982.

Reception

Writing for Allmusic, music critic Scott Yanow wrote of the album "Pass swings hard throughout, is consistently inventive within the bebop tradition, and indulges in close interplay with Pedersen. Together, these musicians make the wondrous seem effortless."

Track listing
"A Foxy Chick and a Cool Cat" (Joe Pass) – 5:29
"Robbins Nest" (Illinois Jacquet, Sir Charles Thompson) – 4:07
"Lush Life" (Billy Strayhorn) – 2:47
"Serenata" (Leroy Anderson, Mitchell Parish) – 3:24
"Love for Sale" (Cole Porter) – 7:29
"Night and Day" (Porter) – 5:34
"We'll Be Together Again" (Carl Fishcer, Frankie Laine) – 5:32
"Ev'rything I Love" (Porter) – 5:01
"Ev'rything I've Got" (Richard Rodgers, Lorenz Hart) – 3:01
"Speak Low" (Ogden Nash, Kurt Weill) – 5:08

Personnel
 Joe Pass - guitar
 Niels-Henning Ørsted Pedersen – double bass
 Martin Drew – drums

References

Joe Pass live albums
Albums produced by Norman Granz
1982 live albums
Pablo Records live albums